The Griboyedov Canal or Kanal Griboyedova is a canal in Saint Petersburg, constructed in 1739 along the existing Krivusha river. In 1764–90, the canal was deepened and the banks were reinforced and covered with granite.

The Griboyedov Canal starts from the Moyka River near the Field of Mars. It flows into the Fontanka River.

Before 1923, it was called the Catherine Canal, after the Empress Catherine the Great, during whose rule it was deepened. The Communist authorities renamed it after the Russian playwright and diplomat, Alexandr Griboyedov.

The streets or embankments running along the canal are known as Naberezhnaya Kanala Griboyedova.

Bridges 

There are 21 bridges across the canal:

 Tripartite Bridge
 Novo-Konyushenny Bridge
 Italian Bridge
 Kazansky Bridge
 Bank Bridge
 Flour Bridge
 Stone Bridge
 Demidov Bridge
 Hay Bridge
 Kokushkin Bridge
 Voznesensky Bridge
 Podyachensky Bridge
 Bridge of Four Lions
 Kharlamov Bridge
 Novo-Nikolsky Bridge
 Krasnogvardeysky Bridge
 Pikalov Bridge
 Mogilyovsky Bridge
 Alarchin Bridge
 Kolomensky Bridge
 Malo-Kalinkin Bridge

Cultural references 

Griboedov Canal appears on the cover of the 2011 contemporary classical album, Troika.

The canal is a key location in Fyodor Dostoyevsky's novel, Crime and Punishment.  Like most locations in the novel, the canal is rarely identified by its proper name; in fact, on most occasions Dostoyevsky refers to it as a kanava, a word which in English is closer to the word "ditch." In a footnote to the Penguin Deluxe Classics edition of the book, translator Oliver Ready describes the canal as a "filthy and polluted place" which is nevertheless "the topographical center of the book." The novel's protagonist, Raskolnikov, repeatedly crosses over the canal, and tentatively plans on disposing of stolen property there.  The apartment building where he commits his crimes "faced the Ditch on one side and [Srednyaya Podyacheskay]a Street on the other."

Gallery

References 

Canals of Saint Petersburg
Canals opened in 1739
1739 establishments in the Russian Empire